Keiyo (Elgeyo) is a Kalenjin language spoken in western Kenya, in the southern part of the district of Elgeyo-Marakwet.

The Elgeyo
The Elgeyo refer to themselves by the name /kéyaːt/ or /kéyêːk/, or in the singular, /kéyo/ or /kéyaː/. The term /kéyo/ also applies to the language.

Classification
Keiyo is one of the languages spoken by the Kalenjin people, and is part of a sub-group that also includes Nandi, Markweta and Kipsigis. These languages and dialects form, along with Datooga and Omotik, the Southern Nilotic languages sub-group of the Nilotic languages.

Phonology
The tables below present the vowels and consonants of Keiyo.

Vowels

There are, additionally, ten long counterparts of each vowel.

Keiyo differentiates its vowels according to their place of articulation. They are either pronounced with the root of the tongue advanced, or with the root of the tongue retracted. The vowels with the root of the tongue advanced are [i], [e], [o], [a], [u], as well as their long counterparts. The vowels with the root of the tongue contracted are [ɪ], [ɛ], [ɔ], [ɑ], [ʊ], as well as their long counterparts.

Consonants

Tone
Keiyo is a tonal language.

References

 

Kalenjin languages